Esterdikola (also Romanized as Esterdīkolā; also known as Estedīr Kolā) is a village in Feyziyeh Rural District, in the Central District of Babol County, Mazandaran Province, Iran. At the 2006 census, its population was 645, in 167 families.

References 

Populated places in Babol County